Barry Clifford (born May 30, 1945) is an American underwater archaeological explorer, best known for discovering the remains of Samuel Bellamy's wrecked pirate ship Whydah [pronounced wih-duh], the only fully verified and authenticated pirate shipwreck of the Golden Age of Piracy ever discovered in the world – as such, artifacts from the wreck provide historians with unique insights into the material, political and social culture of early 18th-century piracy.

Citing federal admiralty law in 1988, the Massachusetts Supreme Court ruled that 100% of the Whydah rightfully belonged to Clifford, and he has kept The Whydah Collection intact without selling a single piece of the more than 200,000 recovered artifacts, which includes tens of thousands of coins, more than 60 cannon, and the "everyday" objects used by the crew. Clifford also has exclusive dive rights to the site, which is patrolled by the National Park Service and U.S. Coast Guard.

Clifford maintains a large private facility in which the majority of the Whydah artifacts are kept for conservation and examination; however, Clifford exhibits a variety of the ship's artifacts, as well as from many other shipwreck discoveries, for the public to enjoy at his Whydah Pirate Museum in West Yarmouth, Massachusetts, with a smaller selection of artifacts on an international touring exhibition through a National Geographic/Premier Exhibitions joint venture, called Real Pirates.

The Whydah Project has been called "a model of underwater archaeology" by the Massachusetts Board of Underwater Archaeological Resources.

Biography

Early life
Born in 1945 on Cape Cod, Barry Clifford has been involved in underwater exploration for most of his adult life. He graduated from Maine Central Institute in Pittsfield, Maine before earning a bachelor's degree in History and Sociology from Western Colorado University in Gunnison, Colorado, and received graduate training at Bridgewater State College in Bridgewater, Massachusetts.

Career
In 1999 and 2000, Clifford and his project team completed three expeditions to Île Sainte-Marie off the coast of Madagascar, as a Discovery Channel Expedition Adventure initiative and tentatively identified the pirate ship Adventure Galley (flagship of William Kidd) and another pirate ship which could be the Fiery Dragon (commanded by the pirate Christopher Condent, also known as William Condon). At the time two other shipwrecks were believed to be in the same area.

After discovering and decoding cryptic rock carvings, he then used ground-penetrating radar to locate and chart an apparent tunnel-complex, similar to the Oak Island Money Pit, which may have been constructed by late-17th-century pirates.

In an ongoing project, Clifford is working to identify suspected in-situ remains of the Santa María — flagship of Christopher Columbus in his first travel to the Indies, wrecked near modern Cap-Haïtien on Christmas Day in 1492. His work as a Discovery "Quest" Scholar to locate this site was the subject of a May 2004 Discovery Channel documentary 'Quest for Columbus'. Also ongoing off the Haitian coast is an archaeological survey project that has tentatively identified four shipwrecks associated with Henry Morgan, including Morgan's flagship The Oxford. In 2010 Clifford returned to lead an expedition to identify the other shipwrecks at Île Sainte-Marie. The expedition is featured in the History Channel documentary 'Pirate Island'.

On 13 May 2014, it was reported by The Independent that a team led by Clifford believed they had found the wreck of the Santa Maria, flagship of Christopher Columbus. Proof of its authenticity was a 15th-century cannon on the wreck site, which is directly out from the beach upon which archaeologists had discovered the site of Columbus' fort, precisely as Columbus wrote in his diary. His discovery is peer-supported. In the following October UNESCO's expert team published their final report, concluding that the wreck could not be Columbus's vessel, claiming fastenings used in the hull, and possible copper sheathing dated it to the 17th or even 18th century. The report was heavily challenged by Clifford saying "It was highly political" and "They conducted a prejudiced and nonscientific investigation of the site."

In May 2015, Clifford found a  silver ingot in a wreck off the coast of Île Sainte-Marie in Madagascar that he believes was part of Captain Kidd's treasure. This was subsequently found to be composed primarily of lead, and the claim of it being connected to Captain Kidd were dismissed by UNESCO: "However, what had been identified as the Adventure Galley of the pirate Captain Kidd has been found by the experts... to be a broken part of the Sainte-Marie port constructions."; Clifford himself has vehemently challenged UNESCO charges as being false and biased.

He is also a Fellow of The Explorers Club.

Works
Clifford has authored articles and books on his explorations; including The Pirate Prince, (Prentice Hall/Simon & Schuster, New York, 1993), Expedition Whydah (HarperCollins, New York, 1999), The Lost Fleet (HarperCollins, New York, 2000), Return to Treasure Island (HarperCollins, New York, 2003), They Lived to Tell The Tale (The Explorers’ Club 2007) Real Pirates: The Untold Story...(The National Geographic Society, 2007), and a 2007 National Geographic children's book of the same name.

His work has been the subject of television documentaries and features as well; including Black Bellamy's Treasure (PBS), Search for Pirate Gold (Nova), Sea-Raiders (Turner Broadcasting), The Hunt for Amazing Treasures (NBC) concerning his discovery of a treasure-filled cannon from the Whydah, Lost Treasure of King Charles I (Discovery Channel), Sea Tales (A&E), Pirates of The Whydah (National Geographic), The Lost Fleet (Discovery Channel/BBC-One), Quest for Captain Kidd (Discovery Channel), Quest for Columbus (Discovery Channel), and The Pirate Code (National Geographic). In 2008 the National Geographic Channel aired a two-hour documentary about the ongoing excavation of the wreck of the Whydah Gally, featuring in-depth interviews with Clifford. It was subsequently released on DVD.

A 2002–03 action-adventure television series entitled "Adventure Inc." produced by Gale Anne Hurd was "inspired by the real life exploits of explorer Barry Clifford." Clifford is also credited as a consultant for that show.

He is a Fellow of the Explorers Club, a 2005 recipient of the Lowell Thomas Award for underwater archaeology, and an Honorary Member of the Boston Marine Society. In 2006, he was named "Explorer-in-Residence" by the American Museum of Natural History in New York.

See also
 Whydah Gally
 Samuel "Black Sam" Bellamy
 Archaeology of shipwrecks
 Maritime archeology
 Underwater archeology
 Wreck diving

References

External links
 Whydah official website
  Massachusetts Board of Underwater Archaeological Resources
 Real Pirates traveling exhibition co-sponsored by The National Geographic Society
 Real Pirates – The National Geographic Society

1945 births
Living people
American explorers
People from Barnstable County, Massachusetts
Western Colorado University alumni
Bridgewater State University alumni
Archaeology of shipwrecks
Treasure from shipwrecks
Fellows of the Explorers Club
Maine Central Institute alumni
20th-century American archaeologists
21st-century American archaeologists